Victor Okechukwu Agali (born 29 December 1978) is a Nigerian former professional footballer who played as a forward.

Career
In 1997, Agali joined French club Olympique de Marseille. Finding it hard to establish a first team place, he quickly moved to Sporting Toulon Var and subsequently to Germany  where he played in Hansa Rostock and Schalke 04. From 2005 to 2007 he played in the Turkish Süper Lig, returning to German Bundesliga team Rostock in August 2007. At Rostock Agali did not do well, after just one goal in 23 league matches he was given a free transfer to the Greek club Skoda Xanthi FC. After a season with Greek club Skoda Xanthi the Nigerian striker has signed for Anorthosis Famagusta.

On 27 December 2009, he was arrested at Schiphol airport near Amsterdam for carrying fake passports.

He moved in summer 2010 to the Chinese Super League club Jiangsu Sainty.

International career
Agali has played for Nigeria at a number of occasions, including the 2000 Summer Olympics.

Honours

Club
Schalke 04
UEFA Intertoto Cup: 2003

International
Nigeria
 Africa Cup of Nations third place: 2004

References

External links
 
 

Living people
1978 births
Association football forwards
MKE Ankaragücü footballers
FC Hansa Rostock players
Footballers at the 2000 Summer Olympics
Nigeria international footballers
Nigerian footballers
Nigerian expatriate footballers
OGC Nice players
Olympic footballers of Nigeria
Olympique de Marseille players
Ligue 1 players
FC Schalke 04 players
SC Toulon players
Xanthi F.C. players
Kayseri Erciyesspor footballers
Jiangsu F.C. players
Chinese Super League players
Süper Lig players
Super League Greece players
Nigerian expatriate sportspeople in Turkey
Bundesliga players
Expatriate footballers in Germany
Nigerian expatriate sportspeople in Greece
Expatriate footballers in Turkey
Nigerian expatriate sportspeople in Germany
Expatriate footballers in Greece
Expatriate footballers in France
Nigerian expatriate sportspeople in China
Expatriate footballers in China
2002 African Cup of Nations players
2004 African Cup of Nations players